The first world record in the men's 50 metres freestyle in long course (50 metres) swimming was recognized by the International Swimming Federation (FINA) in 1976. In the short course (25 metres) swimming events the world's governing body recognizes world records since March 3, 1991.

The drop in world record times in the 2008/2009 coincided with the introduction of polyurethane suits from Speedo (LZR, 50% polyurethane) in 2008 and by Arena (X-Glide), Adidas (Hydrofoil) and Italian swimming suit manufacturer Jaked (all 100% polyurethane) in 2009.  FINA's ban on non-textile suit came into effect in January 2010. FINA also released a list of approved suits.

Men

Long course

Short course

Women

Long course

Short course

All-time top 25

Men long course
Correct as of June 2022

Notes
Below is a list of other times equal or superior to 21.47:
César Cielo also swam 21.02 (2009), 21.08 (2009), 21.14 (2009), 21.30 (2008), 21.32 (2013), 21.33 (2009), 21.34 (2008), 21.35 (2009), 21.37 (2009), 21.38 (2012), 21.39 (2014), 21.47 (2008).
Caeleb Dressel also swam 21.07 (2021), 21.15 (2017), 21.18 (2019), 21.29 (2017, 2021, 2022), 21.32 (2021), 21.42 (2021).
Benjamin Proud also swam 21.16 (2018), 21.30 (2018), 21.32 (2017, 2022), 21.34 (2018), 21.35 (2018), 21.36 (2022), 21.40 (2022), 21.42 (2021, 2022), 21.43 (2017), 21.45 (2018).
Frederick Bousquet also swam 21.17 (2009), 21.21 (2009, 2009), 21.33 (2009), 21.36 (2009, 2010), 21.44 (2009).
Ashley Callus also swam 21.24 (2009).
Bruno Fratus also swam 21.31 (2019), 21.35 (2018), 21.37 (2015), 21.41 (2014), 21.42 (2019), 21.44 (2014), 21.45 (2014, 2014, 2019), 21.47 (2019).
Florent Manaudou also swam 21.32 (2014, 2016), 21.34 (2012), 21.37 (2013), 21.41 (2015, 2016), 21.42 (2016).
Amaury Leveaux also swam 21.32 (2009), 21.38 (2008), 21.45 (2008), 21.46 (2008).
Duje Draganja also swam 21.38 (2009).
Vladimir Morozov also swam 21.41 (2021), 21.44 (2017, 2018), 21.45 (2017), 21.46 (2017), 21.47 (2013, 2018).
Cullen Jones also swam 21.41 (2009), 21.47 (2009).
Eamon Sullivan also swam 21.41 (2008).
Anthony Ervin also swam 21.42 (2013), 21.46 (2016).
Kristian Golomeev also swam 21.45 (2019).
Nathan Adrian also swam 21.46 (2009), 21.47 (2013, 2016).
Michael Andrew also swam 21.45 (2022), 21.46 (2018).
Pawel Juraszek also swam 21.47 (2017).

Men short course
Correct as of December 2022

Notes
Below is a list of other times equal or superior to 20.78:
Caeleb Dressel also swam 20.24 (2019), 20.28 (2020), 20.43 (2018), 20.51 (2018), 20.52 (2020), 20.54 (2018), 20.62 (2018), 20.65 (2020), 20.67 (2021), 20.69 (2020), 20.77 (2021).
Vladimir Morozov also swam 20.33 (2018), 20.39 (2018), 20.40 (2019), 20.45 (2017), 20.48 (2018), 20.49 (2018), 20.51 (2018), 20.55 (2012), 20.59 (2013), 20.61 (2017), 20.66 (2013, 2013), 20.68 (2019), 20.69 (2018), 20.70 (2013), 20.72 (2013, 2017), 20.73 (2016, 2019), 20.77 (2019), 20.78 (2012, 2013).
Jordan Crooks also swam 20.36 (2022), 20.46 (2022).
Ben Proud also swam 20.45 (2021), 20.49 (2022), 20.66 (2017), 20.70 (2017), 20.71 (2018), 20.74 (2015), 20.76 (2022).
Florent Manaudou also swam 20.51 (2014), 20.55 (2020), 20.57 (2019), 20.60 (2020), 20.63 (2020, 2020), 20.66 (2019), 20.69 (2019), 20.70 (2012), 20.77 (2012, 2020).
Amaury Leveaux also swam 20.56 (2009), 20.63 (2008), 20.73 (2009)).
Roland Schoeman also swam 20.57 (2009), 20.64 (2008), 20.69 (2009).
César Cielo also swam 20.59 (2012), 20.61 (2010), 20.68 (2014), 20.72 (2014).
Frederick Bousquet also swam 20.64 (2009), 20.69 (2008), 20.75 (2009).
Duje Draganja also swam 20.71 (2009).
Evgeny Sedov also swam 20.71 (2015).
Ryan Held also swam 20.72 (2021).
Dylan Carter also swam 20.72 (2022), 20.77 (2022).
Kyle Chalmers also swam 20.74 (2019).
Nicholas Santos also swam 20.75 (2009).
Maxim Lobanovskij also swam 20.76 (2019).
Alain Bernard also swam 20.77 (2008).

Women long course
Correct as of June 2022

Notes
Below is a list of other times equal or superior to 24.26:
Sarah Sjöström also swam 23.69 (2017), 23.74 (2018), 23.78 (2019), 23.83 (2017, 2018), 23.85 (2017, 2017), 23.87 (2017), 23.91 (2019, 2022), 23.92 (2018), 23.95 (2017), 23.96 (2017, 2018), 23.97 (2019), 23.98 (2014, 2022), 23.99 (2018), 24.01 (2017, 2017), 24.05 (2019), 24.06 (2022), 24.07 (2019, 2021), 24.08 (2017, 2018, 2022), 24.10 (2023), 24.11 (2019, 2019, 2022, 2022), 24.13 (2017, 2021), 24.14 (2018, 2018, 2020), 24.15 (2014, 2022), 24.17 (2016), 24.18 (2018, 2019), 24.20 (2015, 2016, 2018), 24.21 (2017, 2018), 24.22 (2016, 2019), 24.24 (2018), 24.25 (2019, 2019, 2021), 24.26 (2019, 2021).
Cate Campbell also swam 23.79 (2018), 23.81 (2018), 23.84 (2016), 23.88 (2018), 23.93 (2016), 23.94 (2021), 23.96 (2014), 23.99 (2009), 24.00 (2014, 2019), 24.02 (2019), 24.03 (2015), 24.04 (2016, 2021), 24.05 (2019), 24.08 (2009, 2019), 24.09 (2019), 24.11 (2019, 2019, 2021), 24.12 (2015, 2018), 24.13 (2008, 2014), 24.14 (2013), 24.15 (2016, 2018, 2021), 24.16 (2019), 24.17 (2008, 2008, 2014), 24.18 (2014), 24.19 (2013, 2015, 2018), 24.20 (2008), 24.21 (2014), 24.22 (2015, 2015), 24.23 (2014, 2016), 24.24 (2009, 2018).
Pernille Blume also swam 23.85 (2018), 23.92 (2018), 23.98 (2018), 24.00 (2017), 24.05 (2017, 2018), 24.06 (2021), 24.07 (2016), 24.08 (2019, 2021), 24.09 (2019), 24.12 (2019, 2021), 24.13 (2017), 24.14 (2017, 2019), 24.15 (2017), 24.17 (2021, 2021), 24.20 (2018), 24.21 (2021), 24.23 (2016).
Emma McKeon also swam 23.93 (2021), 23.99 (2022), 24.00 (2021), 24.02 (2021), 24.17 (2021), 24.25 (2019).
Ranomi Kromowidjojo also swam 23.97 (2021), 24.05 (2012, 2013), 24.07 (2012, 2016), 24.10 (2012), 24.11 (2021), 24.14 (2012, 2021), 24.19 (2016), 24.20 (2013, 2017), 24.21 (2012, 2018), 24.22 (2015), 24.23 (2015), 24.24 (2012, 2021), 24.25 (2018).
Marleen Veldhuis also swam 23.99 (2009), 24.09 (2008) 24.20 (2009), 24.26 (2008, 2008).
Liu Xiang also swam 24.03 (2020), 24.04 (2017, 2020), 24.20 (2020), 24.23 (2021), 24.25 (2020).
Simone Manuel also swam 24.05 (2019), 24.09 (2016), 24.10 (2018), 24.12 (2017), 24.21 (2019), 24.22 (2018).
Britta Steffen also swam 24.06 (2008), 24.19 (2008).
Fran Halsall also swam 24.11 (2009), 24.13 (2012, 2016), 24.14 (2014), 24.21 (2016), 24.23 (2016), 24.26 (2016).
Therese Alshammar also swam 24.14 (2011), 24.17 (2009).
Libby Trickett also swam 24.15 (2009), 24.19 (2009), 24.21 (2009, 2009), 24.25 (2008).
Katarzyna Wasick also swam 24.17 (2021, 2022), 24.18 (2022), 24.20 (2022), 24.26 (2021).
Bronte Campbell also swam 24.17 (2019), 24.19 (2015), 24.20 (2014), 24.22 (2018), 24.24 (2015, 2016), 24.26 (2018).
Mariia Kameneva also swam 24.21 (2018).
Shayna Jack also swam 24.23 (2022), 24.26 (2023).
Dara Torres also swam 24.25 (2008).

Women short course
Correct as of December 2022

Notes
Below is a list of other times equal or superior to 23.73:
Ranomi Kromowidjojo also swam 23.05 (2020), 23.19 (2018), 23.23 (2018), 23.24 (2013, 2015), 23.26 (2018), 23.29 (2017, 2019), 23.31 (2017, 2021), 23.32 (2014, 2017), 23.36 (2013), 23.37 (2010, 2020), 23.39 (2017), 23.40 (2018), 23.41 (2020), 23.42 (2017), 23.43 (2014), 23.46 (2018, 2021), 23.47 (2017), 23.48 (2013, 2018), 23.50 (2018), 23.53 (2017), 23.54 (2021), 23.55 (2015, 2020), 23.56 (2015), 23.57 (2013), 23.58 (2009, 2010), 23.59 (2020), 23.60 (2016, 2018), 23.61 (2011), 23.62 (2009), 23.64 (2014, 2020), 23.66 (2017, 2020), 23.67 (2016), 23.69 (2013, 2019), 23.70 (2013), 23.71 (2010, 2018, 2019, 2019).
Sarah Sjöström also swam 23.08 (2021), 23.10 (2017), 23.12 (2021), 23.17 (2021), 23.21 (2018), 23.22 (2017), 23.26 (2018), 23.28 (2017), 23.30 (2017, 2021), 23.31 (2021), 23.34 (2017), 23.36 (2018), 23.39 (2017), 23.40 (2017), 23.41 (2020), 23.42 (2017, 2020), 23.43 (2019, 2020), 23.47 (2021), 23.48 (2018, 2020), 23.50 (2021), 23.51 (2017, 2019), 23.52 (2018, 2019), 23.53 (2021), 23.54 (2018), 23.55 (2014, 2020), 23.59 (2018), 23.62 (2018), 23.63 (2015), 23.66 (2019), 23.67 (2018), 23.72 (2015, 2020).
Katarzyna Wasick also swam 23.27 (2022), 23.30 (2020), 23.32 (2022), 23.37 (2022), 23.40 (2021), 23.41 (2021), 23.43 (2020). 23.47 (2020), 23.49 (2020, 2021), 23.55 (2022), 23.62 (2021), 23.63 (2021), 23.64 (2021).
Cate Campbell also swam 23.33 (2019), 23.35 (2019), 23.45 (2019), 23.46 (2019), 23.47 (2013), 23.48 (2019), 23.62 (2017), 23.64 (2015), 23.65 (2013), 23.67 (2017), 23.68 (2020), 23.72 (2019), 23.73 (2013), 23.74 (2018).
Therese Alshammar also swam 23.34 (2009), 23.59 (2000), 23.64 (2009), 23.67 (2011).
Maria Kameneva also swam 23.35 (2022), 23.48 (2021), 23.56 (2021), 23.65 (2022), 23.70 (2019), 23.72 (2021), 23.73 (2019).
Marleen Veldhuis also swam 23.43 (2011), 23.55 (2008), 23.58 (2007).
Abbey Weitzeil also swam 23.45 (2020), 23.57 (2020), 23.58 (2021), 23.62 (2022), 23.63 (2021), 23.69 (2021).
Hinkelien Schreuder also swam 23.46 (2009), 23.53 (2009), 23.60 (2009), 23.64 (2009), 23.71 (2009), 23.72 (2008).
Emma McKeon also swam 23.50 (2021), 23.51 (2022), 23.53 (2021), 23.54 (2021), 23.56 (2021), 23.60 (2021), 23.65 (2021), 23.69 (2021), 23.70 (2019).
Jeanette Ottesen also swam 23.58 (2016), 23.72 (2016), 23.73 (2014).
Pernille Blume also swam 23.62 (2017), 23.67 (2018), 23.73 (2017, 2019).
Mélanie Henique also swam 23.66 (2019).
Femke Heemskerk also swam 23.69 (2018, 2018), 23.72 (2019).
Anna Hopkin also swam 23.70 (2018), 23.73 (2019).
Fran Halsall also swam 23.73 (2011).

References

External links

  Zwemkroniek
  Agenda Diana
 USA Swimming

Freestyle 0050 metres
World record progression 0050 metres freestyle